
Shen Zhihua (born April 1950 in Beijing) is a professor of history at East China Normal University and adjunct professor at Peking University and Renmin University of China. Shen is an expert in the history of the Soviet Union, Sino-Soviet relations, and the Cold War.
He is director of the Center for Oriental History Studies of the Chinese Academy of Sciences and honorary researcher at the Chinese University of Hong Kong. In 2011 Shen was public policy scholar at the Woodrow Wilson International Center for Scholars in Washington, D.C.

Shen grew up in Beijing, where his father was the penal system in China's second highest ranking official.  His father has first joined Mao Zedong at Yan'an during the Chinese Civil War Shen was a Navy pilot before he was accused of murder and jailed.  He was released after his accuser, a jailhouse informant, recanted.  In the early 1980s, when Shen was a graduate student in world history at the Chinese Academy of Social Sciences,  he was sent to jail again and forced to abandon his studies in a politically inspired incident. Shen went into private business, but eventually returned to Beijing, where he set up a private research organization, Zhongguo Shixuehui Dongfang Lishi Yanjiu Zhongxin (Center for Oriental History Studies, Chinese Historical Association), in 1993. This organization has been extremely productive, helping to publish more than 80 books and monographs and  hosting many conferences and scholarly activities, especially in Soviet history and Sino-Soviet relations.

Shen and Li Danhui, his wife, are known for their generosity to Chinese and foreign scholars, and Shen spent his own money to finance research visits to Moscow for research groups to collect photocopies of archival materials. His wife's father was a close friend of Xi Zhongxun.  Shen has published more than 60 articles and eight monographs, edited five books, and was the chief editor of pioneering documentary collections on Soviet foreign policy and the Korean War.

Andrew Nathan of Columbia University said Shen is "highly regarded" in China for "nuanced histories of key episodes in the Cold War," which form "a solid contribution to the field of Cold War international history" and that his work belongs to "a wave of independent Chinese scholarship that demystifies China's role in the conflict by showing the country to be a self-interested state like any other."  In March 2017, Shen gave a lecture suggesting that China's strategic interests are more aligned with South Korea than North Korea.

Publications 
 《新经济政策与苏联农业社会化道路》 (New Economy Policy and the Russian Socialising of Agriculture) 1994. Published in China.
 《朝鲜战争揭秘》 (The Revealing of the Secret of the Korean War) 1995.  Published in Hong Kong. 
 《毛泽东、斯大林与韩战》 (Mao Zedong, Stalin, and the Korean War) 1998. Published in Hong Kong. 
 《中苏同盟与朝鲜战争研究》 (Research on the Alliance of China and the USSR and the Korean War) 1999. Published in Hong Kong. 
 《中苏同盟的经济背景：1948-1953》 (The Economic Background of the China-USSR Alliance) 2000. Published in Hong Kong. 
 《斯大林与铁托——苏南冲突的起因及其结果》 (Stalin and Tito: The Beginning and the End of the Conflict Between the USSR and Yugoslavia) 2002.
 《苏联专家在中国（1948-1960）》 (Russian Experts in China 1948-1960) 2003. Published in China. 
 《毛泽东、斯大林与朝鲜战争》 (Mao Zedong, Stalin, and the Korean War) 2003. Published in China. 
 《思考與選擇: 從知識分子會議到反右派運動, 1956-1957》 2008. 
 With Danhui Li: After Leaning to One Side: China and Its Allies in the Cold War 2011. Stanford University Press .
 Mao, Stalin and the Korean War: Trilateral Communist Relations in the 1950s. Milton Park, Abingdon ; New York: Routledge, Cold War History Series,  2012. 
《最后的"天朝"：毛泽东、金日成与中朝关系（1945–1976）》Hong Kong: Chinese University Press, 2017. 
A Misunderstood Friendship：Mao Zedong, Kim Il-sung, and Sino–North Korean Relations, 1949–1976, 2018, Columbia University Press,

References

External links 
 Shen Zhihua The China Story Center on China in the World
  學者沈志華花重金搜集蘇聯檔案
  沈志華：發現曾經真實的蘇聯
  沈志華：1950年代蘇聯援華貸款的歷史真相
  好書下載:沈志華 主編：《蘇聯歷史檔案選編》
  翻閱歷史：中蘇關系史綱
  借我一雙慧眼 沈志華教授與他眼中的重大歷史事件
  斯大林、毛泽东与朝鲜战争再议 沈志华　《史学集刊》 2007年第05期

Audio links 
  中苏同盟, 波匈事件与中国, 三年自然灾害, 四清运动, 反右运动的兴起, 朝鲜战争, 中苏分裂的真实原因和内在逻

Historians of China
Cold War historians
Historians of the Korean War
Living people
1950 births
20th-century Chinese historians
Academic staff of the East China Normal University
People's Republic of China historians
Beijing No. 4 High School alumni
Historians of communism